The Yukon New Democratic Party (NDP) is a social-democratic political party in the Yukon territory of Canada.

The Yukon NDP first formed the government of the territory under the leadership of Tony Penikett from 1985 to 1992, and under the leadership of Piers McDonald from 1996 to 2000. The party's current leader is Kate White. The NDP sat as official opposition to the current Yukon Party government in the Yukon Legislative Assembly until May 2006. In the 2006 Yukon election later that year, the three incumbent New Democrat Members of the Legislative Assembly were reelected, but the party failed to win any additional seats and remained in third place behind the five members of the Yukon Liberal Party and the ten member Yukon Party majority government.

In January 2009 the NDP were reduced to two seats: Todd Hardy (Whitehorse Centre) and Steve Cardiff (Mount Lorne), after the Party's third member, John Edzerza, resigned to sit as an independent. Edzerza later rejoined the Yukon Party, for which he had originally been elected in the 2002 Yukon election.

Hardy died in July 2010, reducing the NDP to a single seat. On November 12, a by-election was called for his riding of Whitehorse Centre on December 13, which was won by the Party leader Hanson. Cardiff was killed in a car crash on July 7, 2011, again reducing the party to one seat in the legislature entering the 2011 election.

In the 2011 election the Yukon NDP under Elizabeth Hanson elected six MLAs to form the territory's Official Opposition. The NDP was the only party to see an increase in its share of the popular vote over the 2006 Yukon election. In the 2016 election, the NDP was reduced to two seats and third party status.

In May 2019, Kate White the incumbent MLA for Takhini-Kopper King was acclaimed as the new party leader, replacing Hanson. In the 2021 election the Yukon NDP under White won three seats. On April 23, the incumbent Liberals were sworn in with a minority government. On April 28, the NDP announced that they had entered into a formal confidence and supply agreement with the Liberals.

The Yukon NDP is a territorial section of the federal New Democratic Party.

Leaders of the Yukon NDP
The following is a list of the Yukon NDP leaders since Yukon introduced political parties provincially in 1978.

Election results

See also
List of articles about Yukon NDP members
List of Yukon political parties
List of premiers of Yukon
List of Yukon Leaders of Opposition

References

External links
 Yukon NDP website
Yukon NDP Caucus website

Yukon
Territorial political parties in Yukon
1978 establishments in Yukon
Social democratic parties in Canada